Hethersgill is a village and a civil parish in the Carlisle district, in the county of Cumbria, England. Hethersgill has a church called St Mary's Church.

In 2001 the population of the civil parish of Hethersgill was 382, reducing to 371 at the 2011 Census.

See also

Listed buildings in Hethersgill

References

External links 
 Cumbria County History Trust: Hethersgill (nb: provisional research only – see Talk page)
 Listed buildings in Hethersgill
 http://www.visionofbritain.org.uk/place/place_page.jsp?p_id=1564

Villages in Cumbria
Civil parishes in Cumbria
City of Carlisle